Ramona is a 1936 American Drama Western film directed by Henry King, based on Helen Hunt Jackson's 1884 novel Ramona. This was the third adaptation of the film, and the first one with sound. It was the fourth American feature film using the new three strip Technicolor process. It starred Loretta Young and Don Ameche.

The New York Times praised its use of new Technicolor technology but found the plot "a piece of unadulterated hokum." It thought "Ramona is a pretty impossible rôle these heartless days" and Don Ameche "a bit too Oxonian" for a chief's son.

The film's copyright was renewed.

Plot summary

Cast
 Loretta Young as Ramona
 Don Ameche as Alessandro
 Kent Taylor as Felipe Moreno
 Pauline Frederick as Señora Moreno
 Jane Darwell as Aunt Ri Hyar
 Katherine DeMille as Margarita 
 Victor Kilian as Father Gaspara
 John Carradine as Jim Farrar
 J. Carrol Naish as Juan Can
 Pedro de Cordoba as Father Salvierderra
 Charles Waldron as Dr. Weaver
 Claire Du Brey as Marda
 Russell Simpson as Scroggs
 William Benedict as Joseph Hyar 
 D'Arcy Corrigan as Jeff (uncredited)
 Ethan Laidlaw as Bill (uncredited)

References

External links
 
 
 
 

1936 films
1936 drama films
1930s color films
1930s historical drama films
20th Century Fox films
American historical drama films
Films directed by Henry King
Films set in California
Films based on American novels
Films with screenplays by Lamar Trotti
Films set in the 19th century
Films produced by Sol M. Wurtzel
Films based on Ramona by Helen Hunt Jackson
1930s English-language films
1930s American films